Dean Stacey Martin (born 9 September 1967) is an English former footballer who played in the Football League for Halifax Town, Rochdale and Scunthorpe United.

References

1967 births
Living people
English footballers
Association football midfielders
English Football League players
Footballers from Halifax, West Yorkshire
Halifax Town A.F.C. players
Scunthorpe United F.C. players
Rochdale A.F.C. players
Lancaster City F.C. players
Stalybridge Celtic F.C. players
Bradford (Park Avenue) A.F.C. players